Dama Dam Mast Qalandar is a spiritual Sufi qawwali written in the honour of the most revered Sufi saint of Sindh, Lal Shahbaz Qalandar (1177–1274) of Sehwan Sharif. The original poem was initially written by the 13th-century Sufi poet Amir Khusrow, then further modified by Bulleh Shah in the 18th century.

It is said that this qawwali was adapted from the original prayer by Amir Khusrow, and was then modified completely by Bulleh Shah. Bulleh Shah gave an entirely different color to the qawwali, adding verses in praises of Shahbaz Qalandar and giving it a large tint of Sindhi culture. The poem includes a reference to the town of Sehwan, which is home to the Shrine of Lal Shahbaz Qalandar. The word "Laal" can refer to Jhulelal as a young man, or his red dress.

With origins dating back 600 years, "Dama Dam Mast Qalandar" is a popular traditional Sindhi Sufi Islamic folk song across the northern Indian subcontinent, especially Punjab and Sindh, as well as Iran. Various renditions of the song have been composed and performed by numerous composers and singers over the years.

Ashiq Hussain song

Popular modern renditions of the song include the melody composed by Pakistani music composer Master Ashiq Hussain. Originally called "Lal Meri Pat", the song was initially composed for the 1956 Pakistani film Jabroo. It was sung by Inayat Hussain Bhatti, Fazal Hussain, and A.R. Bismil. Ashiq Hussain was reduced to poverty in later life, living in a slum at the Bazar-e-Hakiman in Lahore. When Hussain died in 2017, most Pakistanis were unaware that he was the original composer of the modern melody.

Noor Jehan song

The most popular modern rendition of the song, which includes Ashiq Hussain's melody, was "Dama Dam Mast Qalandar" from the 1969 Pakistani film Dillan Dey Soudey, where it was modified by Nazir Ali and sung by Noor Jehan. It was then sung by other Pakistani singers like Nusrat Fateh Ali Khan, Aziz Mian, Abida Parveen, the Sabri Brothers, Reshma, Komal Rizvi, and Junoon. The song has also been performed by the Bangladeshi singer Runa Laila, and Indian artists like Hans Raj Hans, the Wadali brothers, Harshdeep Kaur, Nooran Sisters, and Mika Singh (with Yo Yo Honey Singh).

Nusrat Fateh Ali Khan song

Pakistani musicians Nusrat Fateh Ali Khan and M. Arshad composed a new song inspired by "Dam Mast Qalandar", with a different melody and arrangement. It was sung by Khan and released as "Dam Mast Mast" in his 1991 album Mast Qalander (Vol 14). Khan also performed the song for the 1992 Pakistani film Boxer. in both Punjabi and Urdu. His song is variously called "Dam Mast Qalandar Mast Mast", "Dam Mast Qalandar" or "Mast Mast". In 2016, British-Iranian singer Sami Yusuf performed a rendition of Khan's song in his album Barakah.

The Bollywood music director Viju Shah used Khan's version to produce the hit song "Tu Cheez Badi Hai Mast Mast" for the Bollywood film Mohra (1994), the soundtrack album of which sold more than 8million units. In turn, "Tu Cheez Badi Hai Mast Mast" was remade as "Cheez Badi" for the 2017 film Machine.

References 

13th-century poems
13th-century songs
18th-century poems
18th-century songs
1956 songs
1969 songs
1991 songs
Islamic music
Junoon (band) songs
Lal Shahbaz Qalandar
Nusrat Fateh Ali Khan songs
Pakistani folk songs
Indian songs
Qawwali songs
Sindhi-language songs
Year of song unknown
Sufi songs
Rahat Fateh Ali Khan songs
Runa Laila songs
Punjabi-language songs
Urdu-language songs
Neha Kakkar songs
Mika Singh songs
Kavita Krishnamurthy songs